Parvardegār or Parwardigār is an appellation or title for God in the Persian language. Its literal meaning is sustainer, a name metaphorically and attributively used for Khuda or God. 

The word has Persian roots and comes from parva- meaning to foster, cherish, to nurture, to develop/care for. Digar, when applied in this sense, means "again and again." Thus Parvardigar means "to care again and again."

References

Sufi philosophy
Names of God in Sufism